Alexander Thom (1801–1879) was a Scottish publisher, the founder of Thom's Irish Almanac.

Life
He was born at Findhorn in Moray, the son of the writer and journalist Walter Thom. He was educated at the High School, Edinburgh, and went to Dublin at age 20 to assist his father in the management of the Dublin Journal. On his father's death he obtained, through the influence of Sir Robert Peel, the contract for printing for the post office in Ireland. In 1838 he obtained the contract for the printing for all royal commissions in Ireland, and in 1876 was appointed to the post of Queen's Printer for Ireland.

In 1844 Thom founded the work for which he is known, the Irish Almanac and Official Directory, which became a leader in its field. It incorporated statistics relating to Ireland. Thom supervised its publication for over 30 years, passing the copyright to his son-in-law Frederick Pilkington in 1876. "Thom's Directory" was revised annually; in 1960 it was split into Thom's Dublin Street Directory and Thom's Commercial Directory, revised in alternate years until 2012. James Joyce relied heavily on the 1904 edition when writing Ulysses.

In 1860 he published for free distribution A Collection of Tracts and Treatises illustrative of the Natural History, Antiquities, and the Political and Social State of Ireland, two volumes which contain reprints of writers on Irish affairs in the seventeenth and eighteenth centuries. Included are works of James Ware, Edmund Spenser, Sir John Davies, William Petty, George Berkeley, and others such as Gerard Boate, Thomas Prior and Arthur Dobbs.

In 1878, during a printers' strike in Dublin, Thom sent work to Scotland. The resulting publicity brought the issue to the attention of the Westminster Parliament.

Thom, who was twice married, died at his residence, Donnycarney House, near Dublin, on 22 December 1879.

List of Thom's Directories available free online
 Thom's Irish Almanac and Official Directory with the Post Office Dublin City and County Directory, 4th Annual Publication (1847) - (Alexander Thom) (village listings for South Dublin County)
 Thom's Irish Almanac and Official Directory with the Post Office Dublin City and County Directory, 7th Annual Publication (1850) - (Alexander Thom)
 Thom's Irish Almanac and Official Directory with the Post Office Dublin City and County Directory, 8th Annual Publication (1851) - (Alexander Thom)
 Thom's Irish Almanac and Official Directory with the Post Office Dublin City and County Directory, 9th Annual Publication (1852) - (Alexander Thom)
 Thom's Irish Almanac and Official Directory with the Post Office Dublin City and County Directory, 14th Annual Publication (1857) - (Alexander Thom)
 Thom's Irish Almanac and Official Directory with the Post Office Dublin City and County Directory, 16th Annual Publication (1859) - (Alexander Thom)
 Thom's Irish Almanac and Official Directory of the United Kingdom of Great Britain and Ireland, 19th Annual Publication (1862)
 Thom's Irish Almanac and Official Directory of the United Kingdom of Great Britain and Ireland, 27th Annual Publication (1870) - (Alexander Thom)
 Thom's Irish Almanac and Official Directory of the United Kingdom of Great Britain and Ireland, 30th Annual Publication (1873) - (Alexander Thom)
 Thom's Irish Almanac and Official Directory of the United Kingdom of Great Britain and Ireland, 31st Annual Publication (1874) - (Alexander Thom)
 Thom's Irish Almanac and Official Directory of the United Kingdom of Great Britain and Ireland, 33rd Annual Publication (1876) - (Alexander Thom)
 Thom's Irish Almanac and Official Directory of the United Kingdom of Great Britain and Ireland, 34th Annual Publication (1877) - (Alexander Thom) (village descriptions and listings for the South Dublin County area)
 Thom's Irish Almanac and Official Directory of the United Kingdom of Great Britain and Ireland, 35th Annual Publication (1878) - (Alexander Thom)
 Thom's Official Directory of the United Kingdom of Great Britain and Ireland, Annual Publication (1881) - (Alexander Thom)
 Thom's Official Directory of the United Kingdom of Great Britain and Ireland, Annual Publication (1883) - (Alexander Thom)
 Thom's Official Directory of the United Kingdom of Great Britain and Ireland, 41st Annual Publication (1884)

See also
 Isaac Slater

References

Attribution

External links

Maps of Dublin accompanying Thom's Official Directory, 1874-1898. A UCD Digital Library Collection.

1801 births
1879 deaths
Scottish publishers (people)
19th-century Scottish writers
People from Moray
People educated at the Royal High School, Edinburgh
Scottish editors
19th-century Scottish businesspeople